National Shrine of Saint Joseph may refer to:

 , Anchieta, Espírito Santo, Brazil
 Saint Joseph's Oratory, Montréal, Québec, Canada
 , Karlovac, Croatia
 National Shrine of Saint Joseph (Mandaue), Cebu, Philippines
 National Shrine of Saint Joseph (De Pere, Wisconsin), USA
 Cathedral of San José de Mayo, Uruguay

See also 
 National shrine
 Saint Joseph (disambiguation)
 Saint Joseph's (disambiguation)
 St. Joseph Church (disambiguation)
 St. Joseph's Cathedral (disambiguation)
 Cathedral Basilica of St. Joseph (disambiguation)